Crigglestone West railway station served the village of Crigglestone, West Yorkshire, England from 1850 to 1965 on the Hallam Line.

History 
The station opened as Crigglestone on 1 January 1850 by the Lancashire and Yorkshire Railway. The station's name changed to Crigglestone West on 2 June 1924 but was changed back to Crigglestone on 12 June 1961. The station closed to both passengers and goods traffic on 13 September 1965.

References

External links 

Disused railway stations in Wakefield
Former Lancashire and Yorkshire Railway stations
Railway stations in Great Britain opened in 1850
Railway stations in Great Britain closed in 1965
1850 establishments in England
1965 disestablishments in England
Beeching closures in England